MG5 or MG 5 may refer to:

 British NVC community MG5, community type in the British National Vegetation Classification system
 Heckler & Koch MG5, machine gun, Germany
 MG 5, compact car